Theogonia may refer to:

 Theogony, a poem by Hesiod
 Theogonia (album), a black metal album by Rotting Christ